A list of windmills in Somme, France

External links
French windmills website

Windmills in France
Somme
Buildings and structures in Somme (department)